Jamie Johnson (born 14 May 1972) is a British judoka.

Judo career
Johnson is a five times champion of Great Britain, winning the British Judo Championships in 1993, 1994, 1997, 1999 and 2000.

Other achievements

See also
European Judo Championships
History of martial arts
List of judo techniques
List of judoka
Martial arts timeline

References

External links

British male judoka
1972 births
Living people
Place of birth missing (living people)